Anthony Wall (born 1951) is a British documentary filmmaker whose lifelong contribution to cinema has been honoured with the Special Medallion of the Telluride film festival. He was the longest-serving Series Editor of the BBC's flagship arts documentary strand Arena, voted by leading TV executives in Broadcast magazine as one of the top 50 most influential programmes of all time.

Early life
Anthony Wall was born in Hackney, East London, in 1951, and grew up in Herne Hill. He attended a Catholic grammar school before studying English at King's College, Cambridge.

In 1974 he joined BBC Radio as a trainee studio manager. That same year he joined the Morning Star as its first rock critic.

Wall moved across to television production in 1978, working in the Music and Arts (Television) department of the BBC under its head Humphrey Burton.

Arena

He joined the Arena production office in late 1978, when Alan Yentob was in charge of its Theatre and Art & Design strands. This was soon consolidated into a series of single films, moving away from the magazine format. Wall was instrumental in this shift, forming the core team with directors Nigel Finch and Nigel Williams, together developing a more discursive and playful approach to art documentary. With Finch as director, Wall co-devised the landmark films My Way, Chelsea Hotel and The Private Life of the Ford Cortina.

As an emerging director on the series, Wall profiled Luck and Flaw, John Peel, Desert Island Discs, The Everly Brothers, Superman, Mikey Smith, Luis Buñuel and Jerry Lee Lewis.

In 1985, Wall was appointed joint series editor alongside Finch, replacing Yentob who had been promoted to Head of Music and Arts. Together they pioneered the themed evening, beginning with Blues Night (1985), followed by Caribbean Nights (1986), Animal Night (1989), Food Night (1990) and the immersive Wall-directed Texas Saturday Night (1991). With Radio Night (1993) they took over both BBC Two and BBC Radio 4 for a unique simulcast.

A sister series Rhythms of the World (1988–93) was added to Finch and Wall's roster, reflecting the abundance of extra material shot for Arenas world music films. It was also a strand for original work, with many of its 69 films being new commissions.

When Finch died in 1995, Wall continued as series editor for a further 23 years. In place of a weekly slot Arena had now entered a new era of occasional "specials" in the schedules, and would grow to enjoy a major presence on the international documentary stage. High-profile collaborations with Martin Scorsese, Clint Eastwood and Bob Dylan were broadcast in this period.
  
Since 2015, Wall has developed Night and Day, also known as The Arena Time Machine, an ongoing art project with film editor/director Emma Matthews. It is a series of films made entirely from the Arena archive that simply present the day and night as they proceed, each one in exact synchronicity with the date and time of the screening.  They vary in length from eight to 24 hours, and have appeared in Cambridge, Brighton, New York, San Francisco, Telluride, Ireland, Sheffield and London.

Wall stepped down as series editor in 2018. He was succeeded by Mark Bell as commissioning editor.

Awards
Wall has personally been awarded three Bafta awards, three Royal Television Society awards, an Emmy, the Prix Italia, and the Special Medallion of the Telluride Film Festival. He also accepted the Mel Novikoff Award at the San Francisco International Film Festival 2019 on behalf of Arena.

Selected filmography

References

External links
 

Living people
BAFTA winners (people)
Emmy Award winners
English television editors
British television producers
Date of birth missing (living people)
People from Hackney Central
BBC people
Alumni of King's College, Cambridge
1951 births